Perkinson is a surname. Notable people with the surname include:

 Coleridge-Taylor Perkinson (1932–2004), American composer
 Robert Perkinson, American historian

See also
 Parkinson (surname)
 Allen C. Perkinson Airport